Hayes Crossing is an unincorporated community in Stephens County, in the U.S. state of Georgia, at an elevation of  above mean sea level.

History
The community was named after William Hayes, an early settler.

Red Hollow Road
Hayes Crossing was connected to other communities in early colonial Georgia, after General Oglethorpe ordered River Road built from Savannah to Augusta. River Road connected to the ancient Indian trade route of Upper Cherokee Path (renamed "Petersburg Road") at Augusta, connecting that city to the market city of Petersburg. The Upper Cherokee Path continued  from Petersburg to Toccoa where it intersected with the Unicoi Turnpike, which continued into East Tennessee. The section of the Cherokee Path passing through Toccoa was known as the Red Hollow Road, which passed through the community of Hayes Crossing. A Georgia Historical Marker was erected to commemorate the road.

Railroad station
In 1878, the Southern Railroad laid track in Stephens County, crossing the Red Hollow Road 13 times between Toccoa and Martin. Stations were established at several locations in the county, including one at Hayes Crossing.

References

Unincorporated communities in Stephens County, Georgia